Paraoa, Tohora, or Hariri is a small atoll of the central Tuamotu Archipelago in French Polynesia. It is located 76 km south of Hao Atoll's westernmost point. The closest land is Manuhangi Atoll, 52 km to the west.

Paraoa Atoll is ovular in shape. Its lagoon is not connected to the ocean by a pass, which makes this small atoll quite inaccessible. Paraoa Atoll is uninhabited.

History
The first recorded European who arrived to Paraoa was Englishman Samuel Wallis in 1767. He named it "Gloucester".

Administration
Paraoa belongs to the commune of Hao (Main village: Otepa), which includes also Ahunui (uninhabited), Nengonengo, and Manuhangi (uninhabited).

References

External links
Presidency of French Polynesia site
Atoll list (in French)

Atolls of the Tuamotus